Choisy may refer to:
 Choisy-le-Roi, a commune of the Val-de-Marne département, France
 Choisy Cathedral in Choisy-le-Roi
 Château de Choisy a demolished royal palace at Choisy-le-Roi
 Choisy, Haute-Savoie, a commune of the Haute-Savoie département, France
 Choisy-en-Brie, a commune of the Seine-et-Marne département, France
 Porte de Choisy (Paris Metro), a station of the Paris Métro
 Choisy-au-Bac, a commune of the Oise département, France
 Choisy-la-Victoire, a commune of the Oise département, France

People with the family name
 François-Timoléon de Choisy (1644–1724), French author
 Jacques Denys Choisy (1799–1859), botanist
 Auguste Choisy (1841–1909), French architectural historian and educator
 Maryse Choisy (1903–1979), French philosophical writer
 Maurice Gustave Benoit Choisy (1897–1966, M. Choisy), mycologist and lichenologist

Surnames of French origin